Mithrobuzanes (d. 334 BC) was a Persian governor (satrap) of Cappadocia in the 4th century BC, during the reign of Darius III. He was probably a son of Ariarathes. As a Persian military commander he was killed at the Battle of Granicus fighting Alexander the Great.

The victorious Alexander appointed Abistamenes in his place.

References

Sources

External links
Original text of The Anabasis of Alexander
English version of The Anabasis of Alexander

Achaemenid satraps of Cappadocia
Opponents of Alexander the Great
334 BC deaths
Year of birth unknown
4th-century BC Iranian people
Military personnel killed in action
Darius III